Pregnenolone 16α-carbonitrile (PCN) is a synthetic, steroidal antiglucocorticoid and pregnane X receptor agonist.

See also
 Pregnenolone
 Mifepristone
 Ketoconazole
 Dexamethasone

References

Antiglucocorticoids
Nitriles
Pregnane X receptor agonists
Pregnanes